The 1989 Tel Aviv Open was a men's tennis tournament played on hard courts that was part of the 1989 Nabisco Grand Prix. It was played at the Israel Tennis Centers in the Tel Aviv District city of Ramat HaSharon, Israel from October 16 through October 23, 1989. Second-seeded Jimmy Connors won the singles title.

Finals

Singles

 Jimmy Connors defeated  Gilad Bloom 2–6, 6–2, 6–1
 It was Connors' 2nd title of the year and the 109nd of his career.

Doubles

 Jeremy Bates /  Patrick Baur defeated  Rikard Bergh /  Per Henricsson 6–1, 4–6, 6–1
 It was Bates' only title of the year and the 1st of his career. It was Baur's only title of the year and the 2nd of his career.

References

External links
 ITF tournament edition details